Stillo Island or Stil Island is a small island in the southernmost tip coastline of Vlorë County, (located in the Ionian Sea, 200 meters off the coast of Cape Stillo) Albania.

Stillo's coastlines are the furthest south in terms of Albanian coastlines, although; it is not the most southern point of Albania.

The island and the cape were military zone until 1992 and access was prohibited.

The island is rocky and sparsely vegetated.

It has an area of half a hectare, with an approximate length of 80 meters and a width of 100 meters.

See also
Tourism in Albania
Albanian Riviera
Geography of Albania

References

Islands of Albania
Ionian Islands
Geography of Vlorë County